The School of Nursing, Baptist Christian Hospital, founded in April 1954, is an institute recognized by the Assam Nursing Council and the Indian Nursing Council for the course in General Nursing and Midwifery (GNM).  The institute is located in Tezpur, Assam . The School of Nursing has received Minority status under NCMEI. The Nursing school has an annual intake of 30 students. The institute has separate hostel for boys and girls with a total capacity of 135 beds. Boys Hostel Number of beds - 15, Girls Hostel Number of beds - 120. The institute library has a total 935 number of books and 5 number of journals.

References

External links 

Hospitals in India
Nursing schools in India
Education in Tezpur